Richard Landström, better known as Xizt, is a Swedish former professional Counter-Strike: Global Offensive (CS:GO) player who is currently the head coach for Heroic.

Until February 2018, he played for Ninjas in Pyjamas, but stepped down following a stretch of poor results. On March 11, 2018, he played for Fnatic as in-game leader to replace Golden. On January 21, 2020, he has reunited with former teammates and is part of Dignitas's Male CS:GO Team. Landstöm's biggest result was winning ESL One Cologne 2014, one of Counter Strike's majors.

Playing career 
Landström was the primary IGL for Ninjas in Pyjamas from the formation of the roster to him stepping down in February 2018. Even though he normally wasn't the best performing player on the NiP roster, HLTV ranked him among the top 20 players in 2010 (18th), 2011 (13th) and 2013 (6th).

In April 2018 Landström joined FaZe Clan as a substitute for Olofmeister due to him taking a short break from competitive Counter Strike. In May 2018 Olofmeister rejoined FaZe Clan and Xizt left.

On March 11, 2018, Landström signed with Fnatic.  Many viewed this as a reunion as he had played with Fnatic before, in 2009–2012. He played with Fnatic until October 21, 2019, when he was benched by the organization from the active roster.

On September 18, 2019, Team Dignitas announced they would re-enter male competitive CS:GO.
Later on January 21, 2020, Dignitas confirmed the signing of the former NiP roster of Patrik "F0rest" Lindberg, Christopher "GeT RiGhT" Alesund, Adam "friberg" Friberg, and Richard "Xizt" Landström while adding rising Norwegian star Håkon "Hallzerk" Fjærli with Robin "Fifflaren" Johansson as a coach/manager.

Landström announced his retirement from competitive Counter-Strike on September 23, 2021, ending his 12-year professional career.

Coaching career 
Landström joined Heroic in October 2021 as an analyst and temporary coach for PGL Major Stockholm 2021. He became the team's full-time coach in March 2022, after signing a one-year contract extension.

References

1991 births
Living people
Swedish esports players
Fnatic players
Counter-Strike players
cs:GO